Sammy Carlson (born January 11, 1989) is an American freeskier specializing in slopestyle competitions. He was the first skier to execute a switch triple rodeo 1260 in July 2010 at Mount Hood. Sammy is the star of the Sammy C Project, a TV documentary about his endeavors into skiing.

References

External links
 
 
 Sammy Carlson's Raddest Moments in Skiing
 Oakley.com profile 

1989 births
Living people
American male freestyle skiers
X Games athletes
People from Hood River, Oregon